This is a list of musical compositions by Clémence de Grandval (1828–1907), also known as Marie Grandval and Marie Félicie Clémence de Reiset, Vicomtesse de Grandval.

Opera
Le sou de Lise (1859)
Les fiancés de Rosa (1863), libretto by Adolphe Choler
La comtesse Eva (1864), libretto by Michel Carré
Donna Maria Infanta di Spagna (1865), libretto by Leiser
La pénitente (1868), libretto by Henri Meilhac and William Bertrand Busnach
Piccolino (1869), libretto by Achille de Lauzières. f.p. Paris, Théâtre Italien, 5 January 1869, with Gabrielle Krauss (title role) 
La forêt: poème lyrique (1875), libretto by Clémence de Grandval.
Atala: poème lyrique (c. 1888), libretto by Louis Gallet
Mazeppa (1892), libretto by Charles Grandmougin and Georges Hartmann. f.p. Bordeaux, Grand Théâtre Municipal, April 1892, Ch. Haring, cond. with Maurice Devriès (title role), and Bréjean Bravière.
Le bouclier de diamant

Liturgical choral
Mass (1867)
Stabat mater (1870), cantata
Agnus dei
Gratias
Kyrie
Pater noster
O salutaris

Other choral
Jeanne d'Arc: scène (1862), libretto by Casimir Delavigne
Regrets: scène-mélodie (1866)
Sainte-Agnès (1876), oratorio, libretto by Louis Gallet
Villanelle (1877), duet with flute
La ronde des songes: scène fantastique (1880), libretto by Paul Collin
La fille de Jaïre (1881), oratorio, libretto by Paul Collin
Heures, for 4 voices

Symphonies
One symphony, tried at the Société des Concerts du Conservatoire and performed in 1851 by Berlioz's Société Philharmonique, is lost.

Concertante
Gavotte for piano and orchestra (1885)
Concertino for violin and orchestra
Oboe concerto in D minor, Op. 7

Other orchestral
Esquisses symphoniques (1874)
Ronde de nuit (1879)
Divertissement hongrois (c. 1890)

Chamber
Suite de morceaux for flute and piano (1877)
Chanson suisse for cello and piano (1882)
3 pieces for cello and piano (1882):
Andante con moto
Sérénade
Chant serbe
2 pieces for violin and piano (1882)
Prelude and variations for violin and piano (1882)
Ronde de nuit (1883), arrangement for 2 pianos
2 pieces for oboe, cello and piano (1884):
Romance
Gavotte
Gavotte for cello, double bass and piano (1885)
2 pieces for clarinet and piano (1885):
Invocation
Air slave
Morceaux for cor anglais and clarinet (c. 1900)
2 piano nocturnes, Opp. 5 and 6
Sonata for violin and piano, Op. 8
Mazurka du ballet for 2 pianos
Musette for violin
Offertoire for violin, cello, harp and piano
4 pieces for cor anglais and piano
Romance for cello, double bass and piano
Septet
Trio for oboe, bassoon and piano
Trio for oboe, cello and piano
2 trios for piano, violin and cello
Valse mélancolique for flute and harp

Songs
Collection of c. 50 songs (c. 1860):
"Trilby", text by P. S. Nibelle
"Le bohémien" (1864), text by Michel Carré
"La délaissée" (1867), text by J. du Boys
"Avril" (1869), text by Rémy Belleau
"Eternité" (1883), text by Paul Collin
Six poésies de Sully Prudhomme (1884)
"Noël!" (1901), text by Sully Prudhomme
"Menuet" (1902), text by Fernand Gregh
"Fleur de matin", duet
"Les lucioles"
"Rose et Violette", duet

References

Lists of compositions by composer